Jason Cerbone (born November 2, 1977) is an American actor. He played Jackie Aprile Jr. on the HBO series The Sopranos, Lorenzo Desappio in Law & Order: Special Victims Unit (2012-2016), and Mikey O in Paper Soldiers (2002).

Early life and education 
Cerbone was born in Yonkers, New York. He got his start acting at age four, appearing on a commercial for Sesame Street. He signed with the Ford Modeling Agency in New York City at age seven. Cerbone later appeared in Bon Jovi's "Silent Night" music video, as well as the title character in Suzanne Vega's video for the song "Luka".<ref>{{Cite web|url=http://ew.com/article/2001/05/29/meet-jason-cerbone-sopranos-unwise-guy/|title=Meet Jason Cerbone, The Sopranos''' unwise guy}}</ref>

He attended Sacred Heart High School and Concordia College in Bronxville, New York, earning a Bachelor of Science degree in biology. After graduating from college, he resumed his acting career.

 Career 
Cerbone portrayed Jackie Aprile Jr. in the HBO series The Sopranos. He also had an appearance in the movie Cloverfield, in which he played a New York police officer.

In 2007, Cerbone starred with Gina Ferranti and Ernest Mingione in Charles Messina's play Merging, which won Best Play in The Players' Theater's Shortened Attention Span Theater Festival in Greenwich Village.  Cerbone also starred in the film version of Merging, which was released in 2009, and he made an appearance as an NYPD "ESU guy" in the 2009 film The Taking of Pelham 123. In 2014, he played the role of Detective Johnny Vassallo in the CBS crime drama Blue Bloods'', season 5, episode 3 ("Burning Bridges").

Filmography

Film

Television

Video games

References

External links

1977 births
Living people
People from Yonkers, New York
Concordia College (New York) alumni
American male television actors
20th-century American male actors
21st-century American male actors
Male actors from New York (state)